The National Institute for Health and Care Research (NIHR) is the British government’s major funder of clinical, public health, social care and translational research. With a budget of over £1.2 billion in 2020–21, its mission is to "improve the health and wealth of the nation through research". The NIHR was established in 2006 under the government's Best Research for Best Health strategy, and is funded by the Department of Health and Social Care. As a research funder and research partner of the NHS, public health and social care, the NIHR complements the work of the Medical Research Council. NIHR focuses on translational research (translating discoveries from the laboratory to the clinic), clinical research and applied health and social care research.

History
The NIHR (originally named National Institute for Health Research) was created in April 2006 under the government's health research strategy, Best Research for Best Health. This strategy outlined the direction that NIHR research and development should take. Its predecessor was the NHS Research & Development programme which was established in 1991. Factors influencing the creation of the NIHR were the growing importance of evidence-based medicine in science and policymaking, the spread of New Public Management thinking and increased government funding.

Its budget was over £1.2 billion in 2020–21.   it was the largest national clinical research funder in Europe. In 2022 NIHR changed its name to National Institute for Health and Care Research in order to emphasise its role in social care research.

Notable discoveries and developments 
 NIHR is among the world-leaders in COVID-19 research and recruited over a million people in their studies of the disease. In the RECOVERY trial, NIHR researchers found that the inexpensive steroid dexamethasone lowers the mortality rate among Covid patients receiving breathing support in hospitals.
 NIHR was one of the developers of the UK Standards for Public Involvement which set the framework on how to involve the public in research.
 Delivered a trial for Haemophilia A which resulted in the first successful use of gene therapy for treating the condition.
 Showed that using MRI is better for detecting prostate cancer than the more intrusive biopsy.
 Showed that gefapixant could be used to treat some types of cough, making it the first new cough medicine in 50 years.
 Demonstrated that a blood test can be used to better diagnose pre-eclampsia.

Research

Areas of focus 
In June 2021 NIHR published Best Research for Best Health: The Next Chapter. The document, building on the 2006 Best Research for Best Health strategy, outlined the updated operational principles, core work-streams and areas of strategic focus of the NIHR. Their work-streams include funding research for the NHS, public and global health and social care; investing in expertise and facilities; and involving patients and communities in research. Their current areas of strategic focus include learning from impact of COVID-19 on research and healthcare; researching for patients with multiple long-term conditions, involving under-served communities and regions in research; and improving equality, diversity and inclusion across the Institution.

Research programmes 
The NIHR's funding programmes offer a focused source of funding for researchers within the health and care system in England. Scotland, Wales and Northern Ireland also participate in some of these programmes. The programmes give researchers access to funding to undertake clinical and applied health and social care research.

NIHR's funding programmes are:
 Efficacy and Mechanism Evaluation
 Evidence Synthesis
 Health and Social Care Delivery Research
 Health Technology Assessment
 Invention for Innovation
 Policy Research Programme
 Programme Development Grants
 Programme Grants for Applied Research
 Public Health Research
 Research for Patient Benefit

Research schools 
The NIHR has established three national research schools: the School for Primary Care Research, the School for Social Care Research, and the School for Public Health Research. Each national school is a research collaboration between academic centres in England. The three schools take part in developing evidence for use in practice and provide training and career development opportunities for researchers in their respective sectors.

Research units 
NIHR funds a range of university-based collaborations that undertake research in priority areas: blood and organ donor health, health protection, and health and social care policy. Each unit focuses on a priority topic, for example blood donation, healthcare-associated infections, and adult social care.

Global health research
Supporting the UK International Development Strategy and the United Nations’ Sustainable Development Goals, NIHR launched its Global Health portfolio in 2016. It funds applied health research that directly addresses the diverse health needs of people in low- and middle-income countries (LMICs) using UK Aid from the UK government. As well as funding Global Health Research Units and Groups, partnerships between British universities and LMIC institutions, NIHR invests in training and development in global health research and strengthening the research capacity of LMICs at individual, institutional and system level. Engaging and involving local communities in the design and delivery of health research is also part of the programme.

In accordance with NIHR's open access policy, research created with such funding needs to be published in an open access journal. NIHR's global health spendings can be checked through the database of the International Aid Transparency Initiative.

Since 2020, NIHR's global health research units and groups have been involved in efforts to tackle the spread and impact of the Covid-19 pandemic in LMICs.

Public partnerships 
The NIHR offers several ways for patients and the public to participate in health and care research. People can take part in a study as a research participant, for example in a clinical trial that looks for new treatments for a health condition. People who are not affected by a particular condition or who care for someone with a long-term health issue can also take part in research. The NIHR runs the online services Be Part of Research and Join Dementia Research to inform the public about what health and care research is and to help them find studies that are looking for participants.

Patients and the public can also contribute to research through patient and public involvement (PPI). PPI is a partnership between members of the public (including patients, service users, carers) and researchers where public representatives can influence what should be a priority for research and help shape how the research is carried out, applied and communicated. Members of the public can find involvement opportunities in NIHR's research through the database People in Research. The website Learning for Involvement also offers information and resources for learning about public involvement and best practice case studies. The NIHR's global health research funding application process also requires applicants to meaningfully involve affected communities in their research, a practice known in the global health context as Community Engagement and Involvement (CEI).

Infrastructure 
NIHR funds research infrastructure that provides expertise, specialist facilities, a delivery workforce and support services. This infrastructure supports and delivers research funded by government bodies, medical research charities, the life sciences industry and other relevant industries.

NIHR coordinates and supports clinical research through its Clinical Research Network (CRN). With 15 local networks scattered across England, the CRN provides help to patients, the public and health and care organisations to participate in research. In 2021-22, the network recruited more than a million participants to clinical research studies, most of whom were taking part in research to help discover new treatments and vaccines for the COVID-19 pandemic.

Since 2007, the NIHR also supports translating scientific developments into direct clinical treatments and applications through its twenty Biomedical Research Centres (BRCs). The BRCs operate as partnerships between local NHS organisations and academic institutions such as the University of Oxford or the University College London. The NIHR has also established Clinical Research Facilities (CRFs), dedicated spaces for delivering research and trials, at 28 NHS hospitals.

The NIHR also funds three Patient Safety Translational Research Centres which focus on translating discoveries on patient safety into practice.

Researching specific regional health and care issues, the NIHR has a network of 15 Applied Research Collaborations (ARCs). The ARCs are made up of partnerships between universities, NHS providers, local authorities and other organisations. Based at NHS organisations, the NIHR Medtech and In vitro diagnostic Co-operatives (MICs) work with commercial companies on developing new medical technologies and research in vitro diagnostic tests.

Career development and support 
The NIHR Academy, launched in 2018, develops and coordinates the NIHR's academic training, career and research capacity development. Its launch was an output and recommendation of the strategic review of training which looked at the future training and support needs of researchers.

The NIHR Academy provides training and career development awards from pre-doctoral level to research professorships.  the Dean of the NIHR Academy is Professor Waljit Dhillo, Professor in Endocrinology and Metabolism, and Consultant Endocrinologist. He also holds the position of Head of the Division of Diabetes, Endocrinology & Metabolism at Imperial College London.

The award of NIHR Senior Investigator is given to recognise "the most prominent and prestigious researchers funded by the NIHR and the most outstanding leaders of patient and people-based research within the NIHR research community", and held for four years with the possibility of a second term and then alumnus status. The NIHR's flagship award is the Research Professorship which funds the clinical and applied health research of outstanding academics for 5-years. Similarly, the Global Health Research Professorship funds research that benefits low and middle income countries.

Key people and structure 
Responsibility for the NIHR lies with the Chief Scientific Advisor to the Department of Health and Social Care (DHSC). Professor Sally Davies (Dame Sally from 2009) held this post from 2004 to 2016, and led the founding of the NIHR in 2006. She was succeeded by Professor Chris Whitty (who has also been Chief Medical Officer for England since 2019).

Since August 2021, the current holder of the post is Lucy Chappell, Professor of Obstetrics at King's College London.

Delivery of NIHR responsibilities is mainly managed by a number of Coordinating Centres contracted to the Department of Health and Social Care:
 The NIHR Academy: develops and coordinates career development and academic training for researchers.
 Central Commissioning Facility (CCF) and NIHR Evaluation, Trials and Studies Coordinating Centre (NETSCC): commissions, funds and disseminates research to improve patient care.
 Clinical Research Network Coordinating Centre (CRN): supports the initiation and delivery of research in the NHS and in community and social care settings.
 Centre for Engagement and Dissemination (CED): supports greater public involvement in public health and social care research and works on disseminating research evidence.
 NIHR Office for Clinical Research Infrastructure (NOCRI): helps NIHR's potential partners to navigate the NIHR's centres, facilities and expertise. It established and manages the Translational Research Collaborations.

Publications 
The NIHR publishes five peer-reviewed, open access journals which make up the NIHR Journals Library. The journals are titled Efficacy and Mechanism Evaluation, Health and Social Care Delivery Research, Health Technology Assessment, Public Health Research, and Programme Grants for Applied Research. Researchers working in relevant, NIHR-funded projects are required to publish in an NIHR journal. Besides publishing the final research articles, the NIHR Journals Library supports the model of open science by providing a transparent, 'living' document for each research project which is updated alongside the progress of the study. This involves publishing all relevant materials from the outset of the studies, including the relevant systematic reviews, research protocol, study documentation, plain English descriptions, and data.

The NIHR publishes short, easy-to-read summaries and thematic overviews of the most important research findings on the NIHR Evidence website. Some of the summaries are also published in The British Medical Journal.

The NIHR also has an open science platform where researchers can share any kind of relevant articles, documents and data including negative or null results.

Open access 
NIHR has an open access policy and was one of the original funders of Europe PubMed Central. Their updated policy requires all NIHR-funded, peer-reviewed research articles submitted after June 2022 have to be immediately, freely and openly accessible to all. The articles are required to use the  Creative Commons attribution (CC BY) or the Open Government Licence (OGL).

Achievements and recognition
 In 2016, NIHR commissioned the independent RAND Europe think tank and the Policy Institute at King's College London to collate and synthesise 100 examples of positive change arising from NIHR's support of health and care research in its first 10 years. The assessment  found that the NIHR had "transformed research & development in and for the NHS and the patients it serves".
 In 2017, the NIHR was awarded one of the first 'Cochrane-REWARD prizes for reducing waste in research' for the Adding Value in Research Programme
 In 2018, an article published in Public Health identified that NHS trusts with increased NIHR-adopted clinical trial activity are associated with reduced mortality levels.
 In 2022, a study looking at clinical trial transparency among European medical research funders ranked NIHR the highest for being the most compliant in implementing best practices.
 In September 2022, NIHR Cambridge BRC announced what is believed to be UK's first demonstration of genomic data federation by connecting the trusted research environments of NIHR Cambridge BRC with Genomics England as part of a UK Research & Innovation-funded project involving University of Cambridge, NIHR Cambridge BRC, Genomics England, Lifebit, Eastern Academic Health Science Network, and Cambridge University Health Partners.

See also 
 Medical Research Council
 National Institute for Health and Care Excellence
 Health Research Authority
 Medicines and Healthcare products Regulatory Agency
 Health and Care Research Wales
 NHS Research Scotland

References

External links 
 
 Evidence website — shares NIHR's research findings in plain language.
 NIHR Journals Library — five open access journals.

Government research
National Institute for Health and Care Research
Medical research institutes in the United Kingdom
Science and technology think tanks based in the United Kingdom
Medical and health organisations based in England
Funding bodies of England
Research organisations in England
2006 establishments in England